Raja Rani is a 1956 Indian Tamil-language film directed by A. Bhimsingh and written by M. Karunanidhi. The film stars Sivaji Ganesan and Padmini. The film was produced by National Productions . It was released on 25 February 1956.

Plot 

Rani is the only daughter of an impoverished, visually challenged man. Her hunt for a job ends when she is engaged as a box office window ticket vendor at a drama company by its owner Babu. During a play, some gangsters rob Rani of the day's collection, drug her and escape with the booty. The evil-minded Babu who turns up later tries to take advantage of Rani's condition. However, she escapes from him and jumps into a car, falling unconscious in the rear seat.

Raja is the owner of an electrical goods company with a passion for theatre and is the lead player in Babu's drama troupe. Unaware of the turn of events, Raja reaches home. He is surprised to find a girl in his car. Then he comes across a news item that a rich man's daughter named Leela has run away from home. He thinks the girl in the car is Leela. Pretending to be Leela, Rani starts acting in the drama troupe. The two fall in love. Raja then launches his own drama company and stages Socrates, playing the title character. Babu tries to wreck the love of Raja and Rani, and so adds real poison to the drink to be given to Raja in the scene that has Socrates drinking poison. How the lovers get united forms the rest of the film.

Cast 

Male
 Sivaji Ganesan as Raja
 S. S. Rajendran as Babu
 N. S. Krishnan as Samarasam
 K. Durai Sami as Gnanakannu
 M. N. Krishnan as Current

Female
 Padmini as Rani
 Raja Suclochana as Geetha
 T. A. Mathuram as Shantham
 Angamuthu as Geetha's mother

Production 
After the success of Parasakthi (1952), many producers approached M. Karunanidhi to write scripts for them. One of the films he wrote was Raja Rani. Sivaji Ganesan was cast as the lead actor, making this the first of 18 collaborations with director A. Bhimsingh. The film was shot at the now-closed Newtone Studios in Kilpauk. Its owners were Dinshaw K. Tehrani and Jiten Banerjee, who supervised the audiography and cinematography respectively. G. Vittal Rao handled the camera. The dances were choreographed by Hiralal and Sampathkumar. The film also features two plays: one based on Socrates, and another on Cenkuttuvan.

Soundtrack 
The music was composed by T. R. Pappa while the lyrics for songs were written by M. Karunanidhi, A. Maruthakasi, K. P. Kamatchi, M. K. Athmanathan, Villipuththan and Vivekan. The songs were well received especially songs like Manippura Pudhu Manippuraa by M. L. Vasanthakumari and Sirippu Idhan Sirappai by N. S. Krishnan & T. A. Madhuram.

Release and reception 
Raja Rani was released on 25 February 1956, and distributed by Subbu & Co. Kanthan of Kalki stated that the film was entertaining piece by piece.

References

External links 
 

1950s Tamil-language films
1956 films
Films about actors
Films about theatre
Films directed by A. Bhimsingh
Films scored by T. R. Pappa
Films with screenplays by M. Karunanidhi
Indian black-and-white films